Finnish Kalo is a language of the Romani language family (a subgroup of Indo-European) spoken by  Finnish Kale. The language is related to but not mutually intelligible with Scandoromani or Angloromani.

Finnish Kalo has 6,000–10,000 speakers and many young people do not know the language. The majority of speakers are from older generations and about two-thirds of the Romanis in Finland still speak the language. There have been some revival efforts. Dictionaries and grammar books have been produced and some universities offer Finnish Kalo. Finnish Kalo has some similarities with the Romani languages in Hungary where stress is placed on the first syllable of the word. This may be related to the fact that both Finnish and Hungarian words have fixed word-initial stress, a feature that would have diffused to the Romani languages. Finnish Kalo has been taught in schools since the late 1980s and some courses were available in the 1970s.

Current situation 
In 2012 only 30% of the 13,000 Romanis in Finland spoke Kalo fluently but about 50% could understand it. It is now uncommon for Kalo speakers to pass the language to children although there have been efforts made to revive it in recent years. There are language nests in Rovaniemi, and in Helsinki, Romani courses were established. In Finland, the municipalities can establish Romani courses if there is enough demand, though there have been problems due to a lack of resources.

Finnish Romani in Sweden have a right to Kalo and Finnish education.

Phonology 

Finnish Kalo has 8 pairs of long and short vowels. Vowel length can be phonemic as in bur 'through' versus buur 'boor' or allophonic as in baaro/baro 'big'.

Finnish Kalo has 9 closing diphthongs and 3 opening diphthongs.

Finnish Kalo has the following consonant phonemes:

Alphabet

See also 
 Miranda Vuolasranta

Notes

References

External links

 Finnish Kalo teaching materials by the  
 Finnish-Kalo Finnish Dictionary Online, Glosbe

Finnish Kale
Languages of Finland
Languages of Sweden
Romani in Sweden
Northern Romani dialects